The Rehlinger cabinet is the current state government of Saarland, sworn in on 25 April 2022 after Anke Rehlinger was elected as Minister-President of Saarland by the members of the Landtag of Saarland. It is the 29th Cabinet of Saarland.

It was formed after the 2022 Saarland state election by the Social Democratic Party (SPD). Excluding the Minister-President, the cabinet comprises six ministers, all of whom are members of the SPD.

Formation 
The previous cabinet was a grand coalition government of the Christian Democratic Union (CDU) and SPD led by Minister-President Tobias Hans of the CDU.

The election took place on 27 March 2022, and resulted in a landslide victory for the SPD, who won an absolute majority of seats with 43.5% of votes. The CDU recorded severe losses and declined to second place with 28.5% and 19 seats, while The Left lost all their seats and the AfD remained steady on 6%.

Owing to the SPD's majority, Rehlinger announced that she would seek to form government alone. She presented her proposed cabinet on 21 April.

Rehlinger was elected as Minister-President by the Landtag on 25 April, winning 32 votes out of 51 cast.

Composition

External links

References 

Politics of Saarland
State governments of Germany
Cabinets established in 2022
2022 establishments in Germany
Cabinets of Saarland